Wexford Borough was a United Kingdom Parliament constituency, in Ireland, returning one Member of Parliament (MP). It was an original constituency represented in Parliament when the Union of Great Britain and Ireland took effect on 1 January 1801.

Boundaries
This constituency was the parliamentary borough of Wexford in County Wexford.

Members of Parliament

Notes:-
 1 Stooks Smith names the MP 1802-1806 as Richard Neville Furness, 1807-1810 as Richard Neville, 1811-1813 as Robert Neville and 1814-1819 as Richard Neville. Walker names the MP for all these terms as Richard Nevill.
 2 From 1832 known as Robert Fitzwygram.
 3 Not an election - date when the previous member was unseated and the petitioner was declared duly elected.
 4 Not an election - change of party allegiance.

Elections

Elections in the 1830s

 On petition, Wigram was unseated and Dering was declared elected.

Elections in the 1840s

Elections in the 1850s

Elections in the 1860s

On petition, Devereux was unseated due to "informality" in the return, causing a by-election at which he was re-elected.

Elections in the 1870s
Devereux resigned, causing a by-election.

Elections in the 1880s

Redmond's death caused a by-election.

Healy resigned to stand at the 1883 by-election in Monaghan, causing a by-election.

References

The Parliaments of England by Henry Stooks Smith (1st edition published in three volumes 1844–50), 2nd edition edited (in one volume) by F.W.S. Craig (Political Reference Publications 1973)

Westminster constituencies in County Wexford (historic)
Constituencies of the Parliament of the United Kingdom established in 1801
Constituencies of the Parliament of the United Kingdom disestablished in 1885
Wexford, County Wexford